The 2019 Hong Kong Open (officially known as the Yonex-Sunrise Hong Kong Open 2019 for sponsorship reasons) was a badminton tournament which took place at the Hong Kong Coliseum in Hong Kong from 12 to 17 November 2019 and had a total prize of $400,000.

Tournament
The 2019 Hong Kong Open was the twenty-fourth tournament of the 2019 BWF World Tour and also part of the Hong Kong Open championships, which has been held since 1982. This tournament was organized by Hong Kong Badminton Association and sanctioned by the BWF.

Venue
This international tournament was held at the Hong Kong Coliseum in Hong Kong.

Point distribution
Below is the point distribution table for each phase of the tournament based on the BWF points system for the BWF World Tour Super 500 event.

Prize money
The total prize money for this tournament was US$400,000. Distribution of prize money was in accordance with BWF regulations.

Men's singles

Seeds

 Kento Momota (first round)
 Chou Tien-chen (quarter-finals)
 Shi Yuqi (second round)
 Anders Antonsen (quarter-finals)
 Chen Long (quarter-finals)
 Jonatan Christie (semi-finals)
 Viktor Axelsen (quarter-finals)
 Anthony Sinisuka Ginting (final)

Finals

Top half

Section 1

Section 2

Bottom half

Section 3

Section 4

Women's singles

Seeds

 Tai Tzu-ying (withdrew) 
 Akane Yamaguchi (semi-finals)
 Chen Yufei (champion)
 Nozomi Okuhara (quarter-finals)
 Ratchanok Intanon (final)
 P. V. Sindhu (second round)
 He Bingjiao (quarter-finals)
 Saina Nehwal (first round)

Finals

Top half

Section 1

Section 2

Bottom half

Section 3

Section 4

Men's doubles

Seeds

 Marcus Fernaldi Gideon / Kevin Sanjaya Sukamuljo (quarter-finals)
 Mohammad Ahsan / Hendra Setiawan (final)
 Li Junhui / Liu Yuchen (semi-finals)
 Takeshi Kamura / Keigo Sonoda (first round)
 Fajar Alfian / Muhammad Rian Ardianto (second round)
 Hiroyuki Endo / Yuta Watanabe (semi-finals)
 Han Chengkai / Zhou Haodong (first round)
 Kim Astrup / Anders Skaarup Rasmussen (second round)

Finals

Top half

Section 1

Section 2

Bottom half

Section 3

Section 4

Women's doubles

Seeds

 Mayu Matsumoto / Wakana Nagahara (semi-finals)
 Yuki Fukushima / Sayaka Hirota (second round)
 Chen Qingchen / Jia Yifan (champions)
 Misaki Matsutomo / Ayaka Takahashi (quarter-finals)
 Lee So-hee / Shin Seung-chan (quarter-finals)
 Greysia Polii / Apriyani Rahayu (withdrew) 
 Du Yue / Li Yinhui (quarter-finals)
 Kim So-yeong / Kong Hee-yong (second round)

Finals

Top half

Section 1

Section 2

Bottom half

Section 3

Section 4

Mixed doubles

Seeds

 Zheng Siwei / Huang Yaqiong (withdrew) 
 Wang Yilü / Huang Dongping (second round)
 Dechapol Puavaranukroh / Sapsiree Taerattanachai (quarter-finals)
 Yuta Watanabe / Arisa Higashino (champions)
 Seo Seung-jae / Chae Yoo-jung (quarter-finals)
 Chan Peng Soon / Goh Liu Ying (second round)
 Praveen Jordan / Melati Daeva Oktavianti (second round)
 Marcus Ellis / Lauren Smith (withdrew)

Finals

Top half

Section 1

Section 2

Bottom half

Section 3

Section 4

References

External link
 Tournament Link

Hong Kong Open (badminton)
Hong Kong Open (badminton)
Hong Kong Open (badminton)
Hong Kong Open (badminton)